Old Sport is a bluegrass album by American musician John Hartford and Texas Shorty (Jim Chancellor), released in 1995 (see 1995 in music).

Track listing
 "Miller's Reel"
 "Liverpool Hornpipe"
 "Georgia Boys"
 "Pretty Polly Anna"
 "Midnight on the Water"
 "Salt River"
 "Lady's Fancy"
 "Old Sport"
 "Snowbird on the Ash Bank"
 "Laughing Boy"
 "Bonapart's Retreat"
 "Pretty Little Widder"
 "Jack O' Diamonds"

Personnel
John Hartford – vocals, banjo, fiddle, guitar
Texas Shorty (Jim Chancellor) - fiddle

References

John Hartford albums
1995 live albums